Kuvykovo is a rural locality (a selo) in Akhmetovsky Selsoviet, Kushnarenkovsky District, Bashkortostan, Russia. The population was 294 as of 2010. There are 9 streets.

Geography 
Kuvykovo is located 28 km southeast of Kushnarenkovo (the district's administrative centre) by road. Medvederovo is the nearest rural locality.

References 

Rural localities in Kushnarenkovsky District